Zurian Hechavarría Martén (born 10 August 1995) is a Cuban athlete competing in the 400 metres hurdles. She represented her country at the 2016 Summer Olympics without advancing from the first round.

She represented Cuba at the 2020 Summer Olympics.

Her personal best in the event is 54.99 seconds set in Tokyo in 2021.

International competitions

References

1995 births
Living people
Cuban female hurdlers
Athletes (track and field) at the 2015 Pan American Games
Athletes (track and field) at the 2019 Pan American Games
Pan American Games competitors for Cuba
Athletes (track and field) at the 2016 Summer Olympics
Olympic athletes of Cuba
World Athletics Championships athletes for Cuba
Central American and Caribbean Games gold medalists for Cuba
Central American and Caribbean Games bronze medalists for Cuba
Competitors at the 2014 Central American and Caribbean Games
Competitors at the 2018 Central American and Caribbean Games
Central American and Caribbean Games medalists in athletics
Athletes (track and field) at the 2020 Summer Olympics
20th-century Cuban women
21st-century Cuban women